State Highway 56 is a New Zealand state highway. It begins at SH 57 at Makerua and runs north-east to Palmerston North from the West. The state highway officially terminates on Pioneer Highway at its intersection with Maxwells Line just at the entrance to the city.

History

It was rerouted to intersect  instead in 1997, with the section between Maxwells Line and its intersection with SH 3 also being revoked.

See also
 List of New Zealand state highways

References

External links
New Zealand Transport Agency

56
Transport in Manawatū-Whanganui